Sudan of the Future is a cross-party political movement in the Republic of Sudan. It describes itself as a "youth-driven" political movement that supports progressive candidates regardless of their affiliations. The movement advocates public investment, democratic reform, Secular State, tolerant society, a green economy and a basic income for all.

History
Following the declaration of Adil Abdel Aati to run for the Sudanese Presidential Election in 2020, which was announced with the program entitled "for Sudan of the Future", the movement was established . In the following months, many individuals and political organisations joined the movement, including :
Liberal Party of Sudan
Sudan Green Party
Tawasul ( Communication) Party

Issue-based campaigns
In 2017-2018 , Sudan of the Future conducted wide offline and online consultations with supporters to identify their priorities for the movement. The issues supporters identified as being the most important to campaign on were the Youth Employment, Gender Equity  and Basic Income. Sudan of the Future since then designed its program based on this information.

Leaders
Since the foundation, a number of prominent public figures have endorsed the movement so far, with the following individual being listed as the organisation's leaders: 
 Adil Abdel Aati
 Rudwan Dawod
 Zakia Sideeg
 Ibrahim Nageeb

See also 
 Politics of Sudan
 Adil Abdel Aati

References

External links 
 

Politics of Sudan